Garan Croft is a Welsh amateur boxer who won a silver medal at the 2022 European Championships. His twin brother, Ioan, is also an amateur boxer. The twins come from Crymych.

Garan Croft fights at light-middleweight, whilst his brother fights in the welterweight division. The brothers took up boxing together at Cardigan ABC. The Welsh-speaking brothers were featured in an S4C television documentary prior to the Commonwealth Games 2022, for which they were both selected to represent Wales. Although they are sparring partners, they fight at different weights partly because their mother insists that they do not fight against one another in a serious bout. On the same weekend that Garan was awarded a bronze medal at the Commonwealth Games 2022, his brother Ioan won a gold medal.

References

Living people
Date of birth missing (living people)
Year of birth missing (living people)
Welsh male boxers
Light-middleweight boxers
Boxers at the 2022 Commonwealth Games
Commonwealth Games bronze medallists for Wales
Commonwealth Games medallists in boxing
Medallists at the 2022 Commonwealth Games